The 1990 Reading Borough Council election was held on 3 May 1990, at the same time as other local elections across England and Scotland. One third of Reading Borough Council's 45 seats were up for election.

The election saw the Labour party increase its majority on the council, gaining two seats from the Conservatives.

Results

Ward results
The results in each ward were as follows (candidates with an asterisk* were the previous incumbent standing for re-election):

References

1990 English local elections
1990